Maston House, also known as Cannon's Savannah, is a historic home located near Seaford, Sussex County, Delaware. It was built in 1727 and enlarged in 1733.  It is a -story, single pile, brick structure with a gable roof in the "Resurrection Manor" style. As such, it resembles Maryland rather than Delaware houses.  It has shed-roof dormers. The interior has wide floor boards and a narrow enclosed staircase winding around the chimney. It is one of Sussex County's oldest brick structures.  A small frame addition from the 1970s is attached to the northern end.

It was added to the National Register of Historic Places in 1975.

References

External links 
Delaware Public Archives: Maston House

Houses on the National Register of Historic Places in Delaware
Houses completed in 1733
Houses in Sussex County, Delaware
Historic American Buildings Survey in Delaware
Seaford, Delaware
National Register of Historic Places in Sussex County, Delaware